EOO may refer to:

 Extent of occurrence, a concept in Occupancy–abundance relationship
 end of object, a type of operator in the computer data interchange format BSON
 Exchange of Options for Options, a kind of Exchange for Related Positions (EFRP) contrasted to an Exchange of futures for physicals
 Église Orthodoxe Occidentale, a group involved in Western Rite Orthodoxy in the Orthodox Church of France